Eyre was an electoral district of the Legislative Assembly of Western Australia. It was in existence for three separate periods (1950 to 1962, 1989 to 2005, and 2008 to 2017), on each occasion covering large portions of south-eastern Western Australia. Eyre was a safe seat for the Labor Party in its first two incarnations, but during its third incarnation was a marginal seat between the Liberal Party and the National Party.

History
Eyre was first created for the 1950 election, mostly replacing Kanowna, and abolished ahead of the 1962 election. Labor MP Emil Nulsen, the former member for Kanowna, was the district's only member over the period, and was unopposed on two occasions.

Eyre was again created for the 1989 election, mostly as a replacement for Esperance-Dundas. It was abolished ahead of the 2005 state election. The district ultimately included the Shires of Coolgardie, Dundas, Laverton, Leonora, Menzies and Yilgarn, as well as the Boulder district and non-metropolitan components of the City of Kalgoorlie-Boulder. This incarnation of Eyre was held at all times by the Labor Party, and historically, only Southern Cross returned a consistent majority for the Liberal Party. The district was largely replaced by Murchison-Eyre.

An electorate named Eyre was created for a third time, on this occasion for the 2008 election. The new district was drawn from parts of Murchison-Eyre and Roe – both of which were abolished – as well as a small part of Kalgoorlie. Eyre is centred further south and west than its previous incarnations, incorporating large parts of the former seat of Roe  – in particular, the towns of Esperance and Ravensthorpe. Roe had always been a non-Labor seat; indeed, Labor was frequently pushed into third place in that seat. For this reason, the new seat of Eyre was much less favourable to Labor than its predecessors. The new member was Liberal MP Graham Jacobs, who was previously the member for Roe. He held the seat until it was abolished in a redistribution prior to the 2017 state election, which also saw Roe re-created.

Members for Eyre

Election results

References

External links
 
 
 

Former electoral districts of Western Australia
1950 establishments in Australia
Constituencies established in 1950
2017 disestablishments in Australia
Constituencies disestablished in 2017